Vimpelles is a commune in the Seine-et-Marne department in the Île-de-France region in north-central France.

The 19th-century French hellenist, byzantinist, historian, papyrologist, translator and academician Wladimir Brunet de Presle (1809–1875) died in Vimpelles (then Parouzeau).

Demographics
Inhabitants of Vimpelles are called Vimpellois.

See also
Communes of the Seine-et-Marne department

References

External links

Communes of Seine-et-Marne